Dragonhaven is a fantasy novel written by Robin McKinley, published by Putnam in 2007.

Plot summary 
The story is set in the Smokehill National Park, a wildlife preserve for the preservation and study of dragons. The dragons are elusive; evidence of their existence can be found everywhere, but the dragons themselves remain hidden. Young Jake Mendoza, who lives with his father, the owner and director of the park, goes out  for his first overnight solo and comes across a dying dragon. The dragon has been fatally injured by a poacher who has breached the security of the wildlife preserve.

The fact that a dragon has killed a human, even a poacher, will make life very complicated for Smokehill National Park, which exists in a tough political climate, due to the controversial nature of keeping dragons alive.  But what makes life even more complicated for Jake is that he discovers that the dying dragon had been a mother, and that one of her dragonlets is still alive.  It is illegal to save the dragon's life, but Jake, having discovered the baby dragon, cannot leave it to die. He takes the dragon home and raises it.

However, this creates a controversy.  The family of the dead poacher want the dragons at Dragonhaven killed.  Jake and the other rangers are trying their best to convince those against the preservation of dragons that the creatures are really peaceful and friendly.

The bulk of the story involves Jake's growing relationship with the young dragon and other dragons, all the responsibilities that come along with caring for an orphaned wild animal, and his own maturation from child to young adult. The novel is written in a childish style at first, but Jake's writing style matures as he matures.

In the end, Dragonhaven is saved by Jake and his dragon "friends," as they slowly learn how their two species can communicate with each other by their mind, in the process proving that dragons are as intelligent as humans and wish to be at peace with them.

Characters
 
Jake Mendoza - main character

Lois - the dragon-let that Jake finds

Martha - a friend of Jake's (marries Jake later on)

Eleanor - Martha's younger sister

Billy - the Head Ranger at SmokeHill National Park

Frank Mendoza- the top person at SmokeHill National Park, runs the whole park (Jake's father)

Eric - Jake's "enemy" at DragonHaven. Dislikes Jake for unknown reasons

Snark - Jake's deceased dog

Bud and Gulp - two dragons Jake befriends due to Lois

Grace - Billy's wife

Katie - Martha and Eleanor's Mother

Poacher - A bad guy who kills Lois's Mom

External links
Robin McKinley's Official Site

2007 American novels
2007 fantasy novels
Children's fantasy novels
Novels by Robin McKinley
American children's novels
Dragons in popular culture
2007 children's books